Rangers Football Club is a Scottish football club based in the city of Glasgow.

Numerous fan magazines, blogs and supporters' websites are dedicated to the club and the fans have a famous long-standing rivalry with Celtic, the two Glasgow giants collectively known as "The Old Firm".

Rangers supporters have traditionally been identified with the Protestant and Unionist community in Scotland, as well as in Northern Ireland. The club has a global fan-base, with a worldwide spread of over 600 supporters clubs ranging from North America, Australasia and the Middle East to those closer to home in the United Kingdom. In season 2012–13, Rangers recorded the 18th highest average league attendance in Europe. In 2006, Rangers was one of the best-supported clubs in the UK with an estimated 1.4 million supporters. Rangers have an estimated worldwide fanbase in excess of 9 million supporters.

Fanbase and attendances

Rangers, along with Old Firm rivals Celtic, have the largest support base of all the clubs in Scotland. The club's average attendance is consistently one of the highest in Europe, the figure of 45,750 for the domestic league Season 2012–13 being the 18th highest across the continent. A study of stadium attendance figures from 2013 to 2018 by the CIES Football Observatory ranked Rangers at 18th in the world during that period, even though they had been playing at lower levels for three of those five seasons. Rangers' proportion of the distribution of spectators in Scotland was 27.4%, 8th overall for national audience share across the 51 leagues studied (Celtic's figures were even higher, mainly due to their stadium holding approximately 9,000 more seats).

Record attendances
Rangers fans have contributed to a number of records for massive attendances, most notably the highest home attendance for a British league fixture, 118,567 on 2 January 1939. Ibrox hosted numerous crowds of over 100,000 during the 1950s and 1960s, prior to reconstruction following the Ibrox disaster. Rangers supporters also hold records for the highest attendance at a friendly fixture, 104,679, set at Hampden Park in 1961 vs Eintracht Frankfurt, as well as the largest crowd to watch a non-Cup final fixture, 143,570 for a Scottish Cup semi-final vs. Hibernian in 1948. Rangers hold the world record for a fourth tier match with an attendance of 50,048 against Berwick Rangers during the 2012–13 season.

List of Rangers supporters groups

2008 UEFA Cup final

In 2008, up to 200,000 Rangers supporters traveled to Manchester for the UEFA Cup Final, with some issues of disturbance and disorder. The match between Rangers and Zenit Saint Petersburg was preceded by scuffles between fans.

However, serious disorder was allegedly sparked by the technical failure of a big screen erected in Piccadilly Gardens to transmit the match to thousands of Rangers fans who had traveled to the city without tickets. In addition to property damage, fifteen police officers were injured and ambulance crews attended 52 cases of assault.

2021 George Square disorder

After winning the 2020–21 Scottish Premiership title in March 2021, Rangers fans were criticised for gathering at Ibrox Stadium and at George Square in central Glasgow, despite public gatherings being prohibited due to the COVID-19 pandemic in Scotland. Instances of violence and disorder were observed, multiple police officers were assaulted, several memorial benches were destroyed during celebrations and one Rangers fan was filmed performing a sex act on himself. In all, police made 28 arrests and handed out fixed penalty notices for a variety of offences including assaulting police officers and sectarian-related breaches of the peace. Scotland's First fish Minister, Sturgeon described the scenes as "infuriating and disgraceful".

During the alcohol-fuelled celebrations, a minority of supporters became 'unruly' leading to 'violent clashes' with each other, and then with the police after a decision was made to forcibly disperse the group at 9pm, during which several people were violently assaulted, property was vandalised and missiles and flares were thrown at officers. In all, police made 20 arrests on the day with more expected to follow on review of the incidents. Sturgeon condemned these fans for behaving in "a thuggish, sectarian and selfish manner" and for displays of "vile anti-Catholic prejudice".

Songs and chants

Anthems
Rangers fans song of choice and most commonly sung is a rendition of Follow Follow, this is also the club's official anthem and is played before every home match at Ibrox Stadium. Other anthems played at home matches include Penny Arcade by Roy Orbison and Simply the Best by Tina Turner which is played as the teams come onto the pitch. Rangers adopted this anthem after the club won 9 titles in a row in the 1990s and Rangers supporters started a campaign that got the song into the top 10 of the UK singles chart in 2010 to commemorate the club's 53rd title win.

Fans songs and chants
Songs frequently chanted by Rangers fans include The Bouncy, a chant which involves bouncing up and down on the spot chanting the word "Bouncy" or "Lets all do the bouncy" over and over again; Derry's Walls, a song commemorating the historic siege of Derry in 1689; and Every Other Saturday a song written in the 1960s and originating from an era where Rangers supporters finished work on a Saturday morning, a lot from the River Clyde shipyards, and headed to Ibrox for the afternoon fixture.

Rivalries

Old Firm Derby

The club's most distinct rivalry is with Glasgow neighbours Celtic; the two clubs are collectively known as the Old Firm. Rangers' traditional support is largely drawn from the Protestant Unionist community, whilst Celtic's traditional support is largely drawn from the Catholic Irish community. The first Old Firm match was won by Celtic and there have been over four hundred matches played to date. The Old Firm rivalry has fuelled many assaults, sometimes leading to deaths, on Old Firm derby days; an activist group that monitors sectarian activity in Glasgow has reported that on Old Firm weekends, admissions to hospital emergency rooms have increased over normal levels and journalist Franklin Foer noted that in the period from 1996 to 2003, eight deaths in Glasgow were directly linked to Old Firm matches, as well as hundreds of assaults.

Aberdeen

The rivalry with Aberdeen began in the late 1970s when the two clubs were among the strongest in Scotland. Relations between fans were further soured during a league match on 8 October 1988, when Aberdeen player Neil Simpson's tackle on Rangers' Ian Durrant resulted in Durrant being injured for two years. Resentment continued and in 1998 an article in Rangers pre-match programme branded Aberdeen fans "scum". Rangers stated that they had "issued a full and unreserved apology" to Aberdeen and their supporters, and this was accepted by Aberdeen. In another incident, then Rangers captain Richard Gough accused Aberdeen of only playing when it was against Rangers. This further increased the hostility between supporters of both clubs, which has continued.

Issues with sectarianism and racism

Sectarian chanting by supporters has incurred criticism and sanctions upon the club. In 1999, the vice-chairman of The Rangers Football Club Plc, Donald Findlay, resigned after being filmed singing songs regarded as sectarian during a supporters club event. UEFA's Control and Disciplinary Body have punished Rangers for incidents during European ties, most notably against Villarreal in 2006, Osasuna in 2007, and PSV Eindhoven in 2011.

Some Rangers fans have been accused of making Nazi salutes, most notably at a UEFA Cup game in Israel in 2007. In 2013, a Rangers fan was banned from attending football games for two years after being found guilty of giving a Nazi salute at a youth cup final game.

Rangers partnered with Celtic to form the 'Old Firm Alliance', an initiative aimed at educating children from across Glasgow about issues like healthy eating and fitness, as well as awareness of anti-social behaviour, sectarianism and racism. The club's 'Follow With Pride' campaign was launched in 2007 to improve the club's image and build on previous anti-racist, anti-sectarian campaigns. William Gallard, UEFA's Director of Communications, commended the SFA and Scottish clubs, including Rangers, for their actions in fighting discrimination. In September 2007, UEFA praised Rangers for the measures the club has taken against sectarianism.

In 2003, Rangers chairman John McClelland vowed to 'weed out' those who among the Rangers support who 'indulge in racist behaviour.' after Celtic players Bobo Balde and Momo Sylla were subjected to racist abuse. In March 2015, Rangers director Chris Graham resigned his position after posting derogatory comments about Muslims on social media. In April 2017, some Rangers fans were seen on TV making racist 'monkey gestures' towards Celtic winger Scott Sinclair. In August 2019, UEFA ordered Rangers to close a part of their stadium after their fans were found guilty of 'racist chanting.'. In July 2020, Rangers defender Connor Goldson was criticized by Rangers fans for supporting the Black Lives Matter movement, he described the fans' reaction as 'hate' and 'ignorance', he was supported by ex-Rangers player, Mo Edu who also expressed his "embarrassment" and "disappointment" with some Rangers fans' reaction to the Black Lives Matter movement. These events led Rangers CEO Stewart Robertson to condemn the racial abuse of Rangers players by stating "if you are unable to support our players, regardless of their background, you are not welcome at Ibrox".

Famous fans
 Clive Anderson, English television and radio presenter
 Alastair Burnet, British journalist and broadcaster
 Andy Cameron, Scottish comedian
 Sean Connery, Scottish actor
 Grado, Scottish professional wrestler
 Robbie Fowler, English football manager
 Kenny Logan, Scottish rugby union player
 Lulu, Scottish singer
 Amy Macdonald, Scottish singer
 Drew McIntyre, Scottish professional wrestler
 Colin Montgomerie, Scottish professional golfer
 Marti Pellow, Scottish singer
 Gordon Ramsay, British chef
 Angus Young, Australian musician
 Malcolm Young, Australian musician
 musician

References

External links
Union Bears on Facebook
The Blue Order on Facebook
Sons of Struth on Facebook

Rangers F.C.
Association football supporters